At the 1980 Winter Olympics, ten Nordic skiing events were contested – seven cross-country skiing events, two ski jumping events, and one Nordic combined event.

1980 Winter Olympics events
1980